Boneh-ye Khiraleh (also Romanized as Boneh-ye Khīrāleh) is a village in Howmeh Rural District, in the Central District of Haftgel County, Khuzestan Province, Iran. At the 2006 census, its population was 33, in 7 families.

References 

Populated places in Haftkel County